Carlos Manuel Brito Leal de Queiroz  (born 1 March 1953) is a Portuguese football coach who currently is the head coach of the Qatar national team. He has served as the manager of his native Portugal's national team, the United Arab Emirates, South Africa, Iran, Colombia and Egypt, leading South Africa (2002), Portugal (2010) and Iran (2014, 2018, and 2022) to the FIFA World Cup. At club level, he has also managed Sporting CP, the New York/New Jersey Metrostars in Major League Soccer and Spanish club Real Madrid. He also had two spells as Alex Ferguson's assistant manager at English club Manchester United.

Queiroz has won several awards as a coach in junior levels, and has been successful at senior and club levels, mainly as Alex Ferguson's assistant manager. In 1998, he authored the Q-Report, which detailed plans to enhance footballer development in the United States.

Queiroz is the longest-serving manager in the history of the Iran national team, serving for almost eight years between 2011 and 2019. He returned to the role for Iran's 2022 World Cup campaign. He is the only manager in the country's history to lead them at three consecutive World Cups.

Career
Born in Nampula, Portuguese Mozambique, to Portuguese parents, Queiroz had an undistinguished professional career as a footballer, playing as a goalkeeper in Mozambique before turning to management. He moved to Portugal following Portugal's Carnation Revolution on 25 April 1974, and Mozambique's declaration of independence in 1975. Queiroz is a graduate of the University of Lisbon. He coached the Portuguese under-20 side to two FIFA World Youth Championship wins, in the 1989 and 1991 tournaments.

Early senior career
In 1984, Queiroz was appointed as assistant manager of Estoril-Praia. After that, Queiroz was appointed senior national team coach in 1991. He had a record of 14 wins in 31 matches. Afterwards, he went on to manage the Portuguese Primeira Divisão team Sporting CP in 1994.

He subsequently coached the NY/NJ MetroStars in the United States and the Japanese team, Nagoya Grampus Eight. In between, he found time to author the Q-Report, detailing plans to professionalize the development of footballers in the United States. Queiroz returned to coaching national teams in 1999, when he took the job as head coach of the United Arab Emirates, before becoming head coach of South Africa in 2000. Under Queiroz, South Africa qualified for the 2002 FIFA World Cup, but Queiroz resigned in March 2002 before the finals after falling out with the South African Football Association. Queiroz was part of FIFA XI coaching staff, alongside Brazilian Carlos Alberto Parreira, in a humanitarian friendly match played in war-torn Sarajevo against Bosnia and Herzegovina on 25 April 2000.

Queiroz became a coach at English club Manchester United in June 2002. He began his work at the start of the 2002–03 season, working alongside Alex Ferguson, who had gone without an assistant manager since the departure of Steve McClaren in the middle of 2001.

Real Madrid
Queiroz's position at Manchester United as assistant manager attracted the attention of Real Madrid, who wanted Queiroz as their manager to replace departing manager Vicente del Bosque in the summer of 2003. It was an opportunity to work with FIFA World Player of the Year award winners Zinedine Zidane, Ronaldo and Luís Figo, an opportunity that Queiroz felt unable to turn down. He was appointed on a two-year contract, only a week after the arrival of Manchester United player David Beckham. In the same summer, Real Madrid lost veteran defender Fernando Hierro, defensive midfielder Claude Makélélé and striker Fernando Morientes.

Real Madrid got off to a good start of the 2003–04 season, defeating Mallorca in the Supercopa de España. By mid-season, the team topped the La Liga table and was in contention for the Copa del Rey and the UEFA Champions League trophies. However, they lost their final five matches and finished in fourth place, with Valencia winning the title. They lost the Copa del Rey final to Real Zaragoza and were eliminated from the Champions League in the quarter-finals by Morientes's new team Monaco after a 4–2 first leg win, ending the season with the Supercopa de España as the only trophy won, the first time in five years without a major trophy. Following ten months at the Santiago Bernabéu Stadium, Queiroz was sacked in May 2004.

Return to Manchester United

Queiroz returned to United as Ferguson's assistant in June 2004. Some sources noted the effect of his absence on the club's 2003–04 season, in which they came third in the league and exited early from the Champions League.

In his 2014 autobiography, United captain Roy Keane stated that an argument with Queiroz about loyalty was one of the reasons why the Irishman quit the club in 2005. Keane said during ITV's coverage of the 2018 FIFA World Cup that "one of my big regrets is that I probably should have ripped his head off".

Queiroz was linked with managerial roles with Portuguese side Benfica and the United States national team in 2006 but he remained with Manchester United to help them win the Premier League in 2007. Queiroz was often seen conducting interviews with BBC programmes, such as Match of the Day, as at the time Alex Ferguson refused to speak with the BBC after allegations by the BBC's Panorama programme that Ferguson's younger son Jason, and Portsmouth manager Harry Redknapp, had been involved in corruption regarding cuts in transfer fees. Some of Queiroz's post-match opinions on refereeing were controversial. For example, in 2008 Queiroz was – unsuccessfully – charged with improper conduct by the Football Association after describing referee Martin Atkinson's performance in a match as "a disgrace".

In late March 2008, it was reported that Benfica had, once again, approached Queiroz to become their manager and had made a formal request to Manchester United. United were heavily involved in the 2007–08 Premier League title race, five points clear at the top, with just seven games remaining, and also were still competing in the Champions League – being in the quarter-finals at the time of the enquiry. Queiroz did not make any public response to the approach.

Following Benfica's approach, and amid rumors of an opening as the Portugal national coach, Alex Ferguson started to push for Queiroz to be his successor as manager at Old Trafford and discouraged any possible suitors from approaching him. However, rumours over the summer of 2008 continued to link Queiroz with the Portugal national team managers' role, following the departure of Luiz Felipe Scolari. On 11 July 2008, Manchester United agreed to release Queiroz from his contract, and he was appointed manager for the Portugal national team.

Portugal
On 11 July 2008, it was announced that Queiroz was leaving Manchester United, having agreed to a four-year contract to become the head coach of the Portugal national team.

Portugal struggled under his management during the qualification for the 2010 World Cup. Despite kick-starting their World Cup qualification campaign with a comfortable 4–0 win against Malta in Ta' Qali, Queiroz's team failed to win any of their subsequent four matches.

Home form was poor, with a 3–2 defeat to Denmark followed by 0–0 draws against Albania and Sweden. Together with another goalless draw in Stockholm against Sweden, these results left Portugal with only six points out of a possible 15 and on the brink of missing a major international tournament for the first time since 1998. Building on an improving reliability in defence, Portugal defeated Albania in Tirana 2–1 with a late goal, tied 1–1 against Denmark on 5 September, beat Hungary 1–0 and again 3–0 in the return match, and finally defeated Malta 4–0. These results, together with a defeat of Sweden to Denmark, enabled Portugal to finish the campaign second in the group with 19 points, one ahead of Sweden, and qualify for the UEFA play-offs. They played Bosnia and Herzegovina in home and away legs. Portugal won 1–0 in Lisbon and followed up with a 1–0 victory in Zenica, and as a result they advanced to the finals of the 2010 World Cup.

At the World Cup, Portugal drew 0–0 with the Ivory Coast but then beat North Korea 7–0, the heaviest victory in the World Cup since Germany's 8–0 defeat of Saudi Arabia in 2002. This rout virtually guaranteed Portugal passage to the second round and a second goalless draw with Brazil confirmed qualification. In the second round, they lost to Spain 1–0 and were knocked out having failed to score in three of their four World Cup matches.

Quieroz was suspended for six months by the Portuguese Anti-Doping Authority (Autoridade Antidopagem de Portugal) on 30 August 2010, when he was judged to have disrupted their pre-World Cup procedures; he had been suspended for a month by the Portuguese Football Federation (FPF) for using inappropriate language towards the testers, a lesser charge that he admitted to. He was sacked by the FPF on 9 September.  On 23 March 2011, the Court of Arbitration for Sport upheld his appeal against the Anti-Doping Authority, annulling his suspension.

Iran
On 4 April 2011, Queiroz agreed to a two-and-a-half-year deal to coach Iran until the end of the 2014 World Cup in Brazil alongside goalkeeping coach Dan Gaspar and assistant coach Omid Namazi.

Since Queiroz's role as manager of the Iran national team, he has been renowned for introducing players from the Iranian diaspora to the national squad. These players include German Iranians Daniel Davari and Ashkan Dejagah, Dutch Iranian Reza Ghoochannejhad, Swedish Iranians Omid Nazari and Saman Ghoddos, and Iranian American Steven Beitashour among others.

2014 World Cup

Iran, under Queiroz, began their World Cup qualification campaign successfully, defeating the Maldives 4–0 in the first leg of their second round of qualifiers. After winning 5–0 on aggregate, Iran advanced to the third round of qualifiers, where they were drawn with Indonesia, Qatar and Bahrain. Iran highlighted their position at the top of their group by defeating Bahrain 6–0 at home in the Azadi Stadium, as well as inviting former German youth international, Ashkan Dejagah, who scored twice on his debut against Qatar. After a 4–1 win at Indonesia, Iran qualified for the final round of direct qualifiers, the fourth round.

In the fourth round, Iran were drawn with South Korea, Qatar, Uzbekistan, and Lebanon in their group. Queiroz made new foreign-based additions to his squad, adding players such as Reza Ghoochannejhad to his team. Iran started their fourth round of Asian qualifiers with a 1–0 win in Uzbekistan. Team Melli then drew Qatar and lost in Lebanon before defeating South Korea at the Azadi on 16 October with a goal from captain Javad Nekounam. After a 1–0 loss in Tehran against Uzbekistan, Iran defeated Qatar 1–0 in Doha and Lebanon 4–0 at home. In their last qualification match, Iran defeated South Korea 1–0 in Ulsan Munsu with a goal from European-based Ghoochannejhad, resulting in their qualification to the 2014 World Cup as group winners with 16 points. Thus, Iran became the third team that Queiroz managed to qualify for the World Cup, having reached the 2002 edition with South Africa and the 2010 edition with Portugal, leading the latter to a knockout stage finish.

Iran qualified for the 2014 World Cup as group winners and competed in Group F alongside Argentina, Nigeria, and Bosnia and Herzegovina. On 1 June 2014, Queiroz announced his 23-man squad. Prior to the tournament, they founded the Central Asian Football Association.

In the opening match of the tournament on 16 June, Iran drew Nigeria 0–0, making it their first clean sheet of the FIFA World Cup. In their next match, Iran was defeated by Argentina 1–0 with a late goal from Lionel Messi, and received praise after holding Argentina for 90 minutes while creating some attacking opportunities of their own. Iran was eliminated from the tournament in their next game, a 3–1 defeat to Bosnia and Herzegovina. Iran's lone goal was scored by Reza Ghoochannejhad. Based on a Forbes report, his salary as an Iranian team manager was US$2,098,060 during the 2014 FIFA World Cup.

After the tournament, Queiroz extended his contract until the 2018 World Cup.

2015 Asian Cup

Iran continued their winning streak after 2014 World Cup qualification, securing qualification to the 2015 Asian Cup months later as the highest ranked seed. Iran qualified for the 2015 AFC Asian Cup as group winners, where they were the highest ranked seed. Iran faced Bahrain, Qatar, and the United Arab Emirates in Group C.

With the second highest number of fans in the tournament after hosts Australia, the Iranians defeated Bahrain 2–0 with limited preparations. A defensive-minded Iran then defeated Qatar 1–0 thanks to a Sardar Azmoun goal before defeating the UAE by the same scoreline to reach the top of their group.

In the quarter-finals, Iran faced underdog Iraq, who they had beaten weeks prior in a friendly match. Having received a controversial red card in the first half from referee Ben Williams, Iran led a valiant effort with ten men, scoring two goals late in extra time to draw the match 3–3. In the ensuing penalty shootout, Iran lost 7–6 in sudden death.

2018 World Cup

Iran began their 2018 World Cup qualification campaign with friendly matches against Chile and Sweden in March 2015. Queiroz resigned from his managerial post thereafter due to disagreements with the Iranian Football Federation. On 14 April 2015, Iran were drawn with Oman, India, Turkmenistan, and Guam in the second round of qualifiers.

On 26 April, Queiroz announced that he would continue as the manager of Iran for their 2018 World Cup campaign. Iran ended their second round qualifying with a 4–0 victory against India and a 2–0 win against Oman. Iran finished top of the group with 20 points from eight games, Queiroz and his team managed to avoid defeat and remain unbeaten in the second round of World Cup qualifying. Iran was placed in Pot 1 alongside Australia for the draw of the third round of World Cup qualifying. They drew with South Korea, Uzbekistan, Qatar, China and Syria. With two games remaining, Iran qualified to the World Cup with defeating Uzbekistan at the Azadi Stadium. They became third team to qualify to the World Cup after host Russia and Brazil.

In April 2018, he was one of the applicants for the vacant Cameroon national team job.

After going undefeated in qualification, Iran beat Morocco 1–0 in their opening match of the tournament thanks to a late own goal from Aziz Bouhaddouz, but lost 1–0 to Spain in their second match. Their final match saw Queiroz come up against his home country, Portugal; after going 1–0 down, goalkeeper Alireza Beiranvand saved a penalty from Cristiano Ronaldo to give Iran hope, but they had to wait until injury time at the end of the second half for an equaliser from Karim Ansarifard. The draw might have been enough to see Iran into the knockout phase for the first time in their history at the expense of the Spaniards, but Spain's injury-time equaliser in a 2–2 draw with Morocco meant they qualified with Portugal.

2019 Asian Cup
On 23 September 2018, Queiroz extended his contract until the 2019 AFC Asian Cup, hoping to win Iran's first continental title since 1976. With wins over Yemen and Vietnam, and a draw with neighbours Iraq, Iran won Group D and progressed to the round of 16, where they met the third-placed team from Group F, Oman. A 2–0 win over Oman set up a quarter-final against China, whom they beat 3–0. However, in his 100th match in charge of Iran, the semi-final against Japan saw Queiroz's team concede their first goals of the tournament, all in the second half, losing 3–0. After the match, he left Team Melli.

Colombia
On 7 February 2019, Queiroz took over as the new manager of Colombia on a three-year contract. He was the only European and African coaching a South American national team, and was the fourth European manager to be in charge of the Colombian team after Friedrich Donnenfeld, Toza Veselinović and Blagoje Vidinić. His stint with Colombia began with the 2019 Copa América, where Colombia took first place with a perfect nine points, including a 2–0 win over Argentina. However, Colombia was knocked out by Chile in the last eight, where Colombia was saved with two goals for Chile being disallowed but failed bitterly in the penalty shootout.

Colombia also began the 2022 World Cup qualifiers with hope to make it their third in a row for the second time, and Colombia appeared to be on the right path where they beat neighbor Venezuela and held Chile. However, when matches resumed following the COVID-19 pandemic, Colombia's performance slipped disastrously, with a 0–3 home loss to Uruguay (its worst ever home loss in 82 years) before being shockingly thrashed 1–6 by Ecuador, and this finally put the end to Carlos Queiroz's reign as Colombia's boss.

Egypt
On 8 September 2021, the Egyptian Football Association announced the signing of Carlos Queiroz to replace Hossam El Badry.

2021 Africa Cup of Nations
At the beginning of the tournament, the Egyptian team suffered a loss against its Nigerian team in the first round of Group D of the African Nations Cup. Egypt defeated Guinea Bissau with a goal scored by Mohamed Salah, giving Egypt the first victory in the second round of Group D. After that, Egypt defeated Sudan with a goal scored by Mohamed Abdel Moneim in the match, to raise the national team’s score to 6 points in the third round of Group D, and Egypt qualified for the round of 16. The Egyptian national team qualified for the quarter-finals by penalty shootout, after defeating Ivory Coast 5–4 in the round of 16. In the quarter-final match, Egypt won 2–1 against Morocco. In the semi-final match, Egypt qualified for the final by defeating the host nation Cameroon 3–1 on penalties. This win marked for the first-time ever Queiroz had guided a national team into the final of a competitive football tournament. However, Queiroz could not achieve the glory when Egypt lost to Senegal after penalty shootouts.

2022 World Cup qualification
Egypt qualified for the third round of the World Cup qualifications to face Senegal for a spot in the World Cup in Qatar. However, after a 1–0 win in Cairo, and a 1–0 loss in Dakar, Egypt lost again on penalties; hence, they failed to reach the final competition. He later agreed with the Egyptian Football Association to terminate his contract by mutual consent.

Return to Iran
On 7 September 2022, Queiroz was rehired for a second spell as Iran coach ahead of the 2022 FIFA World Cup, his third World Cup with the country. His appointment was promised as part of Mehdi Taj's successful campaign for a second spell as president of the Football Federation Islamic Republic of Iran. At the World Cup in Qatar, Iran were eliminated in the group stage, following a 6–2 loss to England, a 2–0 win over Wales and a 1–0 defeat to the United States.

The World Cup took place for Iran amidst the backdrop of the Mahsa Amini protests. Queiroz said that his players had the right to protest as long as it conformed with the regulations of the tournament. He took issue with BBC reporter Shaimaa Khalil asking Iran player Mehdi Taremi for his opinion on the protests, and questioned her on whether she would ask the other teams in Iran's group about the British and American withdrawal from Afghanistan.

Qatar 
Queiroz was appointed manager of the Qatar national team in February 2023, succeeding Félix Sánchez, who led them at the 2022 FIFA World Cup which they hosted.

Controversy
Prior to the final 2014 World Cup qualification match against South Korea, Queiroz was angered by the comment made from Choi Kang-hee, the head coach of South Korea, who complained that Iran did not provide the training facilities with sufficient qualities during South Korea's away qualification match against Iran on 17 October 2012. Choi stated that South Korea would defeat Iran to help Uzbekistan qualify for the World Cup finals with South Korea, and that Iran would have to watch the World Cup on television. In response, Queiroz severely criticized Choi in his official comments and mocked him by wearing a T-shirt displaying Choi's face.

After Iran's victory against South Korea in their final qualification match, Queiroz showed his anger at the South Korean national coach with a raised fist gesture, which was deemed offensive by the South Korean players and staff, almost causing a fight between the two teams. As a result of the altercations, Sosha Makani was suspended for their opening match of the 2014 World Cup. Queiroz had answered previously to Choi that Iran had fairly shared what they had with the South Korean national team on their visit to Iran.

Managerial statistics

Honours

Manager
Portugal
FIFA World Youth Championship: 1989, 1991
UEFA European Under-16 Championship: 1989

Sporting CP
Taça de Portugal: 1994–95
Supertaça Cândido de Oliveira: 1995

Real Madrid
Supercopa de España: 2003

References

Notes

External links

Carlos Queiroz profile at Manchester United

1953 births
Living people
Portuguese footballers
Association football goalkeepers
People from Nampula Province
Portuguese expatriate sportspeople in Mozambique
Portuguese football managers
Portuguese expatriate football managers
New York Red Bulls coaches
Manchester United F.C. non-playing staff
La Liga managers
Expatriate football managers in Spain
Expatriate football managers in Iran
Expatriate football managers in the United Arab Emirates
Real Madrid CF managers
J1 League managers
Nagoya Grampus managers
Expatriate football managers in Japan
Portuguese expatriate sportspeople in Japan
Portuguese expatriate sportspeople in Iran
Portuguese expatriate sportspeople in South Africa
Portuguese expatriate sportspeople in Spain
Portuguese expatriate sportspeople in the United Arab Emirates
Portuguese expatriate sportspeople in the United States
Colonial people in Mozambique
South Africa national soccer team managers
Sporting CP managers
Portugal national football team managers
Iran national football team managers
Colombia national football team managers
Qatar national football team managers
Primeira Liga managers
2010 FIFA World Cup managers
2014 FIFA World Cup managers
2018 FIFA World Cup managers
Expatriate soccer managers in South Africa
Expatriate soccer managers in the United States
Technical University of Lisbon alumni
United Arab Emirates national football team managers
2015 AFC Asian Cup managers
A1 Grand Prix team owners
2002 African Cup of Nations managers
2019 AFC Asian Cup managers
2019 Copa América managers
Portuguese expatriate sportspeople in Egypt
Expatriate football managers in Egypt
Egypt national football team managers
Portuguese expatriate sportspeople in Colombia
Expatriate football managers in Colombia
2022 FIFA World Cup managers
Portuguese expatriate sportspeople in Qatar
Expatriate football managers in Qatar